Stavros (Stavrós; before 1927: Demerli (Δεμερλή, Demerli)) is a village in the south of the Larissa regional unit, Greece. It is part of the municipal unit of Enippeas. In 2011 its population was 602. The important railway junction Palaiofarsalos is situated in Stavros.

References

Populated places in Larissa (regional unit)